Boʻston District (before 2019: Boʻz District) is a district of Andijan Region in Uzbekistan. The capital lies at Boʻz.

The district consists of 3 urban-type settlements (Boʻz, Jalolov and Xoldevonbek) and 3 rural communities.

References

Districts of Uzbekistan
Andijan Region